Jacqueline Vaudecrane (22 November 1913 – 27 February 2018) was a French figure skater who competed in ladies singles. She finished first at the French Figure Skating Championships in 1937 and 1938. She celebrated her 100th birthday in 2013 and died in February 2018 at the age of 104.

References

1913 births
2018 deaths
French centenarians
French female single skaters
Women centenarians
Sportspeople from Paris